Coralliozetus rosenblatti, the Spikefin blenny, is a species of chaenopsid blenny found in coral reefs in the eastern central Pacific ocean. It can reach a maximum length of  TL. This species feeds primarily on zooplankton. The specific name honours the ichthyologist Richard H. Rosenblatt (1930-2014) of the Scripps Institution of Oceanography.

References
 Stephens, J. S. Jr. 1963 (31 Dec.) A revised classification of the blennioid fishes of the American family Chaenopsidae. University of California Publications in Zoology v. 68: 1–165, Pls. 1-15.

rosenblatti
Fish described in 1963